is a former Japanese football player.

Playing career
Kurata was born in Joyo on June 22, 1972. After graduating from Juntendo University, he joined newly was promoted to J1 League club, Cerezo Osaka in 1995. He played many matches as center back from first season and became a regular player from 1999. Although his opportunity to play decreased in 2001, the club won the 2nd place in 2001 Emperor's Cup. In 2002, he moved to J2 League club Avispa Fukuoka. He played many matches as center back in 3 seasons and retired end of 2004 season.

Club statistics

References

External links

1972 births
Living people
Juntendo University alumni
Association football people from Kyoto Prefecture
Japanese footballers
J1 League players
J2 League players
Cerezo Osaka players
Avispa Fukuoka players
Association football defenders